Dorjee Wangmo (born ) is a Bhutanese politician who has been a member of the National Assembly of Bhutan, since October 2018.

Education 
She holds a BSc degree in Computer Science.

Political career 
Prior to entering politics, she has served as an ICT officer.

Wangmo was elected to the National Assembly of Bhutan as a candidate of DNT from Sombaykha constituency in 2018 Bhutanese National Assembly election. She received 1,536 votes and defeated Tshewang Rinzin, a candidate of Druk Phuensum Tshogpa.

References 

Bhutanese politicians
1988 births
Living people
Druk Nyamrup Tshogpa politicians
Bhutanese MNAs 2018–2023
Bhutanese women in politics
Druk Nyamrup Tshogpa MNAs